Kevin Pettit is a Canadian retired ice hockey left wing who was an All-American for Cornell.

Career
When Pettit's junior eligibility ended in 1967, he was recruited to play for Cornell University, joining the program on the heels of their first national championship. After a year with the freshman team, Pettit joined the varsity squad and was a major contributor on a team that finished as the runner-up for the 1969 NCAA title. The following season, Pettit helped Cornell complete the only undefeated championship season, winning all 29 games while scoring 51 points, finishing third on the team. Despite the outstanding year, very few Big Red players received any plaudits throughout the season.

Pettit was named team co-captain for his senior season and, due to several players and the head coach having left, the team did not continue their outstanding stretch of nigh-unbeatable hockey. Cornell finished third in ECAC Hockey and did not make an NCAA tournament appearance for the first time in five seasons. Pettit's scoring declined while his penalty minutes ballooned to 111, but he was still named as an All-American.

After graduating, Pettit played briefly in both professional and senior leagues before retiring as a player in 1973.

Career statistics

Regular season and playoffs

Awards and honors

References

External links

1947 births
Living people
Canadian ice hockey left wingers
Ice hockey people from Ontario
Sportspeople from Cornwall, Ontario
Hamilton Red Wings (OHA) players
Cornell Big Red men's ice hockey players
Port Huron Wings players
AHCA Division I men's ice hockey All-Americans
NCAA men's ice hockey national champions